Highridge is a residential estate in Nairobi, located in northern parts of the larger Parklands estate. Administratively, Highridge is a subdivision of the Westlands division of Nairobi.

The City Park of Nairobi is located east of Highridge, while north of the estate is Sigiria forest, which belongs to the larger Karura Forest.

References

Populated places in Kenya
Suburbs of Nairobi